The 2018–19 Santa Clara Broncos women's basketball team represents Santa Clara University in the 2018–19 college basketball season. The Broncos are led by third year head coach Bill Carr. The Broncos were members of the West Coast Conference and play their home games at the Leavey Center. They finished the season 14–17, 6–12 in WCC play to finish in seventh place. They advanced to the second round of the WCC women's tournament where they lost to Pacific.

Roster

Schedule and results

|-
!colspan=9 style=| Exhibition

|-
!colspan=9 style=| Non-conference regular season

|-
!colspan=9 style=| WCC regular season

|-
!colspan=9 style=| WCC Women's Tournament

See also
 2018–19 Santa Clara Broncos men's basketball team

References

Santa Clara Broncos women's basketball seasons
Santa Clara
Santa Clara
Santa Clara